Sabash Babu is a Tamil language action film released in 1993 written by T. Rajender and directed by Sasi Mohan. Rajender himself appears in a major role with his son, Silambarasan appearing in the title role as a child artiste. Heera Rajagopal and T. Rajender played supporting roles. The film released during Deepavali festival 1993. The music and lyrics were by T. Rajendar.

Plot
Lalitha is tortured by her relatives and made insane to take over her whole property. The rest of the film shows how her son Babu saves her mother with the help of his father Veluchamy, an army officer.

Cast
Silambarasan as Babu
Heera Rajagopal as Lalitha Veluchamy, Babu's mother
T. Rajendar as Veluchamy, Babu's father
Kuralarasan
Disco Shanti Cameo Appearance
Silk Smitha Cameo Appearance

Soundtrack
The soundtrack was composed by T. Rajender, who also wrote the songs.
"Maane Marikozhundhe" (Male) - K. J. Yesudas
"Maane Marikozhundhe" (Female) - K. S. Chithra
"Podiyannu" - Chithra
"Aapathuku" - S. P. Balasubrahmanyam
"Thottukava" - S. Janaki

Reception
Malini Mannath of The Indian Express wrote the film "is yet another attempt of T. Rajendar to project his son as alter ego". Kalki gave a negative review for the film.

References

1993 films
1990s Tamil-language films
Indian action films
Films scored by T. Rajendar
1993 action films
Films with screenplays by T. Rajendar